Andrew James Wright (born 21 October 1978) is an English former professional footballer who played as a winger.

Career
Born in Leeds, Wright played for Leeds United, Reading, Fortuna Sittard, Harrogate Town, SV Meerssen, Scarborough, Droylsden, Whitby Town, Bradford Park Avenue, Wakefield & Emley, Sutton Town, Stocksbridge Park Steels, Worksop Town, Leigh RMI, Blyth Spartans, Newcastle Blue Star and Harrogate Railway Athletic.

References

1978 births
Living people
English footballers
Leeds United F.C. players
Reading F.C. players
Fortuna Sittard players
Harrogate Town A.F.C. players
SV Meerssen players
Scarborough F.C. players
Droylsden F.C. players
Whitby Town F.C. players
Bradford (Park Avenue) A.F.C. players
Wakefield F.C. players
Ashfield United F.C. players
Stocksbridge Park Steels F.C. players
Worksop Town F.C. players
Leigh Genesis F.C. players
Blyth Spartans A.F.C. players
Newcastle Blue Star F.C. players
Harrogate Railway Athletic F.C. players
English Football League players
Eredivisie players
Association football wingers
English expatriate footballers
English expatriate sportspeople in the Netherlands
Expatriate footballers in the Netherlands